Jamshed Burki was a popular Political Agent in the Khyber Agency and  North-West Frontier Province Home Secretary in the Home and Tribal Affairs Department. He started his career in the Civil Service after retiring from the Pakistan Army as a Captain.  His first posting was as Commissioner of Swat and he eventually became the Interior Secretary Gov of Pakistan  Interior Minister of Pakistan and was responsible for the Hostage Release from the Afghan Embassy. As Interior Secretary he oversaw Operation Clean-up in Karachi which was launched to control the MQM Crime wave. He was also the Secretary Islamabad Club Islamabad 1990-1993.

Upon retirement he has been actively involved in Pakistan's affairs via the Ex-Servicmen's association who publicly came out against the rule of military dictator Pervez Musharraf.

He has been involved in Pakistan-Afghanistan Peace Jirga to help calm the situation down in the Tribal Areas.

He is the brother of Javed Burki and Cousin of Majid Khan and Imran Khan, the current founder/leader of the Pakistan Tehrik-i-Insaf (PTI) political party. He has one son, who resides in Saudi Arabia, and is a Chartered Financial Analyst (CFA) by profession..

References

Living people
Pashtun people
People from Khyber District
Jamshed
Year of birth missing (living people)